Mason Dixon was an American country music group from Beaumont, Texas, composed of Frank Gilligan (vocals, bass guitar), Jerry Dengler (guitar, banjo), and Rick Henderson (guitar). The band played frequently within the Texas nightclub scene for several years and went on to tour the U.S. and Canada for several more.

Career
The group's founding members were lead vocalist Frank Gilligan (born November 2, 1955) and guitarist Rick Henderson (born May 29, 1953), respectively natives of New York and Texas, who met while attending Lamar University in Beaumont, Texas. The two joined with guitarist Jerry Dengler (born May 29, 1955), a former solo artist from Odessa, Texas, and officially founded the band in 1979. The group's first release was a single titled "Armadillo Country". After this song became a regional hit, record producer Don Schafer signed the band to his Texas Records label. The band released its debut album  Only a Dream Away in 1983 and released five singles from it. First was a cover of The Police's "Every Breath You Take", followed by "Mason Dixon Lines", "I Never Had a Chance with You", "Gettin' Over You", and the album's title track. All of these songs except for "Mason Dixon Lines" made the Billboard Hot Country Songs charts. "Mason Dixon Lines" was also the band's first music video. A second Texas Records album, The Spirit of Texas, charted the single "Houston Heartache" in 1985.

In 1987, the band moved to the also independent Premier One label, for which they recorded the album Homegrown. This album went on to account for their first top-40 hit on Hot Country Songs that year with "3935 West End Avenue". The success of this song led to them being signed by Capitol Records, who issued their next album  Exception to the Rule in 1988. Its title track was the band's highest-charting single, reaching number 35 on Hot Country Songs in 1988. Another single from the album, "When Karen Comes Around", was also made into a music video which aired on CMT.

Henderson left the group in 1989 and was replaced by Terry "Caz" Casburn (vocals, bass). A second album for Capitol, Reach for It, was completed but never released. After Mason Dixon disbanded in 1993, Gilligan moved to Tomball, Texas and held various jobs. He planned to return to music in 2009, but was unable to after being diagnosed with both colorectal cancer and neuropathy. After recovering from both, he released a solo album titled Silver Dollar in 2015.

Discography

Albums

Singles

Music videos

References

Country music groups from Texas
Capitol Records artists
1979 establishments in Texas
Musical groups established in 1979
Musical groups disestablished in 1993
Musical trios